Berlanga de Duero is a municipality located in the province of Soria, in the autonomous region of Castile and León, Spain. According to the 2017 census (conducted by the INE), the municipality has a population of 902 inhabitants.

Geography
It has a Continental Mediterranean Climate, with long, cool winters—due in part to its altitude. The town is bisected by the Douro river, from which it derives part of its name, as well as the Douro's tributaries, the Escalote and Talegones.

Climate

Gallery

References

External links
 
 web del Ayuntamiento de Berlanga
 De la parte Berlanga 
 El románico soriano
 La frontera del Duero

Municipalities in the Province of Soria